Gardelegen Stadt was a Verwaltungsgemeinschaft ("municipal federation") in the Altmarkkreis Salzwedel (district), in Saxony-Anhalt, Germany. It was disbanded in July 2009. The seat of the Verwaltungsgemeinschaft was in Gardelegen.

The Verwaltungsgemeinschaft Gardelegen Stadt consisted of the following municipalities (population in 2005 between brackets):

Berge (730)
Gardelegen (11,740)
Hemstedt (306)
Kloster Neuendorf (531)

Former Verwaltungsgemeinschaften in Saxony-Anhalt